Mark Allen Montgomery (born April 1, 1970) is an American college basketball coach for the Michigan State Spartans, currently at his second stint with the university. He previously was the head men's basketball coach at Northern Illinois University. Montgomery replaced Ricardo Patton as head coach of the Huskies on March 24, 2011. Prior to being named the head coach at NIU, he was an assistant to head coach Tom Izzo at Michigan State for 10 seasons, the last four as associate head coach. The Spartans reached the NCAA tournament in each of Montgomery's 10 seasons on the staff, including three Final Four appearances and a trip to the title game in 2009.

Playing career 
Montgomery was a four-year letter winner at Michigan State from 1988 to 1992 where he also served as captain. Upon completion of his college career, he held the school record for games played at Michigan State (126). He was an All-Big Ten Third Team selection in 1992. He ranks fourth all time in assists and fourth all time in steals for MSU. He averaged 5.3 points and 4.5 assists per game and was a member of the 1990 Big Ten Championship team. He played with current MSU associate head coach, Dwayne Stephens.

Upon finishing his college career, he played four years of professional basketball in Europe and averaged more than 25 points per game.

Coaching career

Assistant at Central Michigan 
Montgomery spent four years as an assistant coach at Central Michigan, joining the staff in 1997 under head coach Jay Smith. He was a part of their MAC conference championship team in 2001.

Assistant at Michigan State 
Montgomery returned to MSU prior to the 2001–02 season. In 2007, he was promoted to associate head coach under Tom Izzo. He helped MSU to three Final Fours, 2005, 2009, and 2010 including the National Championship game in 2009. He coached for MSU for 10 seasons before being hired as a head coach.

Head coach at Northern Illinois 
On March 24, 2011, Montgomery was introduced as the 27th head coach in NIU history. Montgomery took over a program that had traditionally struggled, going 35–83 in the prior four seasons. Montgomery was fired on January 3, 2021 after a 1–7 start to the 2020–21 season.

Back to Michigan State 
On June 7, 2021, Montgomery was named the recruiting coordinator for his alma mater, Michigan State, returning to work under Tom Izzo.

Head coaching record

Notes

References

External links
Michigan State bio
 

1970 births
Living people
African-American basketball coaches
African-American basketball players
American expatriate basketball people in Germany
American expatriate basketball people in Lithuania
American expatriate basketball people in Sweden
Basketball players from Michigan
Central Michigan Chippewas men's basketball coaches
College men's basketball head coaches in the United States
Michigan State Spartans men's basketball coaches
Michigan State Spartans men's basketball players
Northern Illinois Huskies men's basketball coaches
American men's basketball players
Basketball coaches from Michigan
21st-century African-American sportspeople
20th-century African-American sportspeople